The 2010 Food City 500 was held on March 21, 2010 at Bristol Motor Speedway in Bristol, Tennessee as the fifth race of the 2010 NASCAR Sprint Cup Series season. This race marked the last appearance of the rear wing on the Car of Tomorrow, with the spoiler returning the following race.

This race also was the first of three in Carl Edwards' probation following his altercation with Brad Keselowski at the previous race at Atlanta Motor Speedway, in which Keselowski went airborne, subsequently crashing on his side door. The race had 39 lead changes among 13 different leaders and 10 cautions.

The race attendance of 138,000 marked the end of a long streak of sellout seats at the track, which has a capacity of 158,000. The race had been a sellout since 1982. Draconian regulations kept intact since the 1970s along with rising ticket prices and unexciting restrictor plate races at Talladega and Daytona helped to contribute to the empty seats at NASCAR races in addition to declining TV ratings.

Race report

Practices and qualifying

In the first practice, the fastest were Joey Logano, Matt Kenseth, Mark Martin, Jimmie Johnson, and Kasey Kahne; the practice also had three red flags because Kyle Busch, Bobby Labonte, and Jimmie Johnson spun on the frontstretch. During qualifying, Joey Logano won his first Sprint Cup Series pole position while Kurt Busch, Dave Blaney, Jimmie Johnson, and Jeff Gordon rounded out the top-five. There were only two drivers who failed to qualify: Mike Bliss and Max Papis, both suffering their first DNQs of the season. By contrast both Casey Mears (driving for Keyed-Up Motorsports) and rookie Terry Cook (driving for Whitney Motorsports) made their first starts of the season. In the second practice, the fastest were Jimmie Johnson, Juan Pablo Montoya, Jeff Gordon, Dale Earnhardt Jr., and Joey Logano. During final practice, the fastest were Jimmie Johnson, Juan Pablo Montoya, Matt Kenseth, Jamie McMurray, and Joey Logano.

Qualifying results 

OP: qualified via owners points

PC: qualified as past champion

PR: provisional

QR: via qualifying race

* - had to qualify on time

Failed to qualify, withdrew, or driver changes:   Mike Bliss (#36), Max Papis (#13)

Race summary
For pre-race concerts, the musical group 4TROOPS, a military band, and Lee Greenwood performed for the fans. Afterward, 4TROOPS performed the National Anthem, and Rev. Mike Rife, of Vansant Church of Christ, gave the Invocation. Steve Austin gave the command "Gentlemen, start your engines!". Before the race, Terry Cook moved to the back of the field because he missed driver introductions. For the first time in his young career, Joey Logano led the field for the green flag. Immediately after the start, Kurt Busch passed him for the lead. On lap 6, Jimmie Johnson passed Busch for the lead.
While Logano fell back, Johnson continued to lead until lap 30; Busch passed him in heavy traffic. Busch kept the lead until lap 40, at the first caution. The caution came out when Dave Blaney had a flat tire. Brad Keselowski stayed out while other drivers came in to change tires and add gasoline which resulted him getting the lead. On lap 46, the green flag came out again. Keselowski kept the lead until lap 53 when Jimmie Johnson passed him. Five laps later, the second caution came out because Clint Bowyer slammed into the wall from a blown engine. Few drivers went to change tires and add gasoline on this caution; Johnson led the field to the green flag on lap 62. Johnson kept the lead until lap 99 when Busch passed him in traffic.
After Kurt Busch led for seventeen laps, the third caution came out because Denny Hamlin hit the wall in turn two. Most drivers went to pit road to change their tires, but Busch was first off pit road and led them to the green flag on lap 123. Busch's lead would not continue for long as Greg Biffle passed him on lap 124. Three laps later, the fourth caution came out because of rain. With the few rain drops at the track, NASCAR decided to keep the cars on the track to help make sure the track would stay dry. After a sixteen lap caution period, the race resumed on lap 143 with Biffle as the leader. On lap 158, Jimmie Johnson attempted to get the lead but Biffle remained the leader. On lap 191 he was passed by Juan Pablo Montoya for the lead, but  four laps later Biffle retook it.

Nine laps later, on lap 204, Biffle was still the leader, but the fifth caution flag came out because Kasey Kahne hit the wall. On lap 210 the green flag came out with Juan Pablo Montoya the leader. After some switching positions on lap 223 Kurt Busch took the lead. Soon after the lead change, there was a green flag run until lap 263 when the sixth yellow came out because Kyle Busch slammed the outside wall. The race resumed on lap 271 with Kurt Busch the leader.

At lap 300, the top three drivers were Kurt Busch, Mark Martin, and Jimmie Johnson. Then on lap 323 the seventh caution flag waved because Regan Smith had tire troubles. Kurt Busch won the race out of pit road to lead the field to the green flag on lap 331. Ten laps later, on lap 342, the eighth caution came out because of a large wreck. The wreck started with Mark Martin and Greg Biffle colliding; thirteen more cars were involved. On lap 358, the green flag came out with Kurt Busch the leader. By lap 370, the top three positions were occupied by Kurt Busch, Jimmie Johnson, and Jamie McMurray. Rain brought out the ninth caution twenty laps later.

On lap 411, the green flag came back out with Brad Keselowski the leader; Kurt Busch passed him three laps later. By lap 433, Jimmie Johnson caught Kurt Busch. Johnson tried to pass Busch on lap 444, but did not get the lead. During the longest green flag run of the race, Joey Logano hit the turn two wall on lap 479; there was no caution. Three laps later, the tenth caution came out because of debris on the track. During pit stops, Greg Biffle beat everyone out of pit road to lead the field to the green flag on lap 490. Busch and Johnson were fifth and sixth. On lap 492, Tony Stewart took the lead from Biffle; Johnson passed him on the outside a lap later. Jimmie Johnson kept the lead to earn his first career win at Bristol. It was his fiftieth win in his Sprint Cup Series career, and his third win of 2010.

Race results

References

Food City 500
Food City 500
NASCAR races at Bristol Motor Speedway
Food City 500